The beholder is a fictional monster in the Dungeons & Dragons fantasy role-playing game. It is depicted as a floating orb of flesh with a large mouth, single central eye, and many smaller eyestalks on top with powerful magical abilities.

The beholder is among the Dungeons & Dragons monsters that have appeared in every edition of the game since 1975. Beholders are one of the few classic Dungeons & Dragons monsters that Wizards of the Coast claims as Product Identity and as such was not released under its Open Game License. Beholders have been used on the cover of different Dungeons & Dragons handbooks, including the fifth edition Monster Manual.

Publication history
Unlike many other Dungeons & Dragons monsters, the beholder is an original creation for D&D, as it is not based on a creature from mythology or other fiction. Rob Kuntz's brother Terry Kuntz created the Beholder, and Gary Gygax detailed it for publication.

Dungeons & Dragons (1974–1976) 
The beholder was introduced with the first Dungeons & Dragons supplement, Greyhawk (1975), and is depicted on its cover (as shown in the section below). It is described as a "Sphere of Many Eyes" or "Eye Tyrant", a levitating globe with ten magical eye stalks. The beholder later appears in the Companion Rules set, in the Dungeon Masters Companion: Book Two (1984). In 1991, it appeared in the Dungeons & Dragons Rules Cyclopedia.

Advanced Dungeons & Dragons 1st edition (1977–1988) 
With the release of Advanced Dungeons & Dragons 1st edition, the beholder appeared in the first edition Monster Manual (1977), where it is described as a hateful, aggressive, avaricious spherical monster that is most frequently found underground. Ed Greenwood and Roger E. Moore authored "The Ecology of the Beholder", which featured in Dragon #76 (August 1983).

Advanced Dungeons & Dragons 2nd edition (1989–1999) 
Second edition supplements to Advanced Dungeons & Dragons, especially those of the Spelljammer campaign setting, added further details about these classic creatures' societies and culture. Beholders feature prominently in the Spelljammer setting, and a number of variants and related creatures are introduced in the Spelljammer: AD&D Adventures in Space campaign set, in the Lorebook of the Void booklet (1989). It also appeared in the Monstrous Compendium Volume One (1989), and is reprinted in the Monstrous Manual (1993). The book I, Tyrant (1996), and the Monstrous Arcana module series that accompanies it, develops the beholder further. I, Tyrant expands the information on beholders through details of the race's history, religion, culture, settlements and psychology, and more.

Based on Tom Wham's depiction in the first edition Monster Manual, TSR artist Keith Parkinson characterized its popular appearance with plate-like armored scales and arthropod-like eyestalks. Jeff Grubb cites Keith Parkinson's artwork as the inspiration for the beholder-kin created for the Spelljammer campaign setting. The Beholder's xenophobia towards other subraces of Beholders was added after Jim Holloway submitted multiple designs for the Beholder's spelljamming ship and Jeff Grubb decided to keep them all and used xenophobia to explain the differences in design style.

Dungeons & Dragons 3.0 edition (2000–2002) 
The third edition of Dungeons & Dragons included the Beholder in the Monster Manual (2000) with the expanded monster statistics of this release. Beholder variants appear in Monstrous Compendium: Monsters of Faerûn (2001).

Dungeons & Dragons 3.5 edition (2003–2007) 
The beholder appears in the revised Monster Manual for the 3.5 edition (2003). The mindwitness was a sample creature of the half-illithid template using a beholder as the base creature, featured on Wizards of the Coast's website on August 14, 2003. The beholder receives its own chapter in the book Lords of Madness: The Book of Aberrations (2005).

Dungeons & Dragons 4th edition (2008–2014) 
With the release of the fourth edition of Dungeons & Dragons, the beholder once again appears in the Monster Manual for this edition (2008), including the beholder eye of flame and the beholder eye tyrant. Variants of the beholder also appear in Monster Manual 2 (2009), and Monster Manual 3 (2010).

Dungeons & Dragons 5th edition (2014–present) 
The beholder appears along with the more powerful undead death tyrant and the spectator in the 5th edition Monster Manual (2014). Additionally, a zombie beholder also appears under the zombies section later in the book. Volo's Guide to Monsters (2016) provides more detail on beholder culture and contains stats for the death kiss, gauth and gazer beholder-kin. The half-illithid mindwitness also makes an appearance in this book. The book Xanathar's Guide to Everything (2017) contains various notes written from the perspective of the beholder known as Xanathar. Xanathar is also one of the possible villains adventurers can face in the adventure module Waterdeep: Dragon Heist (2018).

Description 

A beholder is an aberration comprising a floating spheroid body with a large fanged mouth and single eye on the front and many flexible eyestalks on the top. It is protected by chitinous plates.

A beholder's eyes each possess a different magical ability; the main eye projects an anti-magical cone, and the other eyes have different spell-like abilities (disintegrate objects, transmute flesh to stone, cause sleep, slow the motion of objects or beings, charm animals, charm humans, cause death, induce fear, levitate objects, and inflict serious wounds). Many variant beholder species exist, such as "observers", "spectators", "eyes of the deep", "elder orbs", "hive mothers", and "death tyrants". In addition, some rare beholders can use their eyes for non-standard spell-like abilities; these mutant beholders are often killed or exiled by their peers. Beholders wishing to cast spells like ordinary wizards relinquish the traditional use of their eyestalks, and put out their central anti-magic eye, making these beholder mages immediate outcasts.

In 4th edition, different breeds of beholders have different magic abilities. Beholder Eyes of Flame only have Fear, Fire, and Telekinesis Rays; Eyes of Frost are the same, with fire replaced by frost. The Beholder Eye Tyrant is mostly unchanged from traditional beholders, but the Death Ray causes ongoing necrotic damage rather than an instant kill, and the Disintegration Ray does not automatically kill its target. Other beholder types each have their own set of abilities. In this edition, the beholder's central eye no longer cancels out magic, instead dazing or giving some vulnerability to its victim.

Society 

Beholders are extremely xenophobic. They will sometimes take members of other, non-beholder races as slaves; however, they will engage in a violent intra-species war with others of their kind who differ even slightly in appearance. This intense hatred of other beholders is not universal; the most prominent exceptions are Hive Mothers, who use their powers of mind control to form hives with other beholders and beholder-kin. Beholder communities in the Underdark often, when provoked, wage war on any and all nearby settlements, finding the most resistance from the drow and illithids.

Beholders worship their insane, controlling goddess known as the Great Mother, though some also, or instead, follow her rebel offspring, Gzemnid, the beholder god of gases.

Some beholder strains have mutated far from the basic beholder stock. These are aberrant beholders, of which there are numerous different types. These aberrants may have differing abilities and/or appearances but the unifying feature among beholders and the various aberrant beholders seems to be a simple, fleshy body with one or more grotesque eyes.

Campaign settings

Forgotten Realms 

Beholders are especially prominent in the Forgotten Realms campaign setting, where they infiltrate and seek to control many sectors of society—many beholders are allied to the Zhentarim, some work with the Red Wizards of Thay, and a particularly powerful beholder, known as "The Evil Eye" or "The Xanathar" controls Skullport's influential Thieves Guild. ("The Xanathar" is the title of the thieves guild leader, passed from one to the next.) Beholders also compete to control the Underdark from where most of them originate, with their base of power in the City of the Eye Tyrants, Ootul.

Spelljammer 
According to Ken Rolston, the beholder and the mind flayer "win starring roles as intergalactic menaces" in Spelljammer, and notes that the beholders, "with their abundant magical powers, are perhaps the most formidable warrior race of the universe, but fortunately they are too busy slaughtering one another to present a big threat to other spacefaring races".

Beholders in the Spelljammer campaign are common antagonists, like the deadly neogi and sadistic illithids. However, one thing prevents them from being the most dangerous faction in wildspace: the beholders are engaged in a xenophobic civil war of genetic purity.

There are a large number of variations in the beholder race with some sub-races having smooth hides and others chitinous plates. Other noticeable differences include snakelike eyestalks or crustacean like eyestalk joints. Some variations seem minor such as variations in the size of the central eye or differences in skin colour. Each beholder nation believes itself to be the true beholder race and sees other beholders as ugly copies that must be destroyed.

Lone beholders in wildspace are often refugees who have survived an attack that exterminated the rest of their nest or are outcasts who were expelled for having some form of mutation. The most famous lone beholder is Large Luigi, who works as a barkeeper on the Rock of Bral.

Beholders use a large number of different ship designs. Some of these ships feature a piercing ram but others have no weaponry. All beholder ships allow a circuit of beholders to focus their eye stalks into a 400-yard beam of magical energy. These ships are powered and navigated by the "orbus" (plural "orbii") race of beholders, who are stunted, albino, and very weak in combat.

Eberron 

In the Eberron campaign setting, beholders served as living artillery during the Daelkyr incursion, using the terrible power of their eyes to shatter whole goblin armies. Beholders do not reproduce naturally and have not created a culture of their own—they are simply the immortal servants of the daelkyr. Most continue to serve their masters, commanding subterranean outposts of aberrations or serving as the hidden leaders of various Cults of the Dragon Below. Others lead solitary lives, contemplating mysteries or studying the world. Such lone beholders may manipulate humanoid communities, but their actions are rarely driven by a desire for personal power.

Members of the Cults of the Dragon Below believe that these creatures function as the eyes of a greater power. Some insist that they serve Belashyrra, a powerful Daelkyr who is also known as the Lord of Eyes. Others claim the beholders are the eyes of Xoriat itself—that while they serve the daelkyr, they are conduits to a power even greater and more terrible than the shapers of flesh.

Variants and kin 
Information about beholder variations and related creatures has been made available in Dungeons & Dragons publications.

Reception 
A reviewer for Arcane magazine described the beholder: "11 eyes, paranoid, xenophobic, having a taste for live animals and being deadly with magic."

Artist Chris Hagerty called the beholder a "creature that looks at you and is destroying you by the power of its magical eyes".

Wizard magazine's top 100 greatest villains ever list selected the beholder as the 99th-greatest villain. Rob Bricken from io9 named the beholder as the most memorable D&D monster.

SyFy Wire in 2018 called it one of "The 9 Scariest, Most Unforgettable Monsters From Dungeons & Dragons", saying that "Beholders are an iconic Dungeons & Dragons monster and one you don’t want to come face to eyestalk with if you can help it."

The beholder (gauth) was ranked sixth among the ten best mid-level monsters by the authors of Dungeons & Dragons For Dummies. The authors described the true beholder as an iconic creature of the game, "What could be more fantastic than a giant floating eyeball with little eye stalks sticking out, all of which shoot magic rays?" Of the gauth, the authors say "its ability to inflict a bewildering variety of damage on a party of heroes is unparalleled... until they fight a true beholder, that is."

The Envoyer magazine called the beholder a terrible beast, properly shown as such in the 3rd edition Monster Manual, in contrast to earlier depictions where it rather looked like "a cuddly rosy ball with too many eyes".

Richard W. Forest commented in "The Ashgate Encyclopedia of Literary and Cinematic Monsters" that the beholder was designed to counter magic-using characters while being a formidable opponent for a whole party due to its versatility.

The beholder was considered one of the "game's signature monsters" by Philip J. Clements.

Appearances in other media
Beholders have appeared in many D&D-related or licensed products including : 
 Two beholders are seen briefly in the 2000 motion picture Dungeons & Dragons.
 The Dungeons & Dragons TV cartoon series featured a beholder in the 1983 episode Eye of the Beholder.
 A beholder also appears in the interactive movie Scourge of Worlds: A Dungeons & Dragons Adventure.
Dungeons & Dragons licensed computer and video games, including the Capcom arcade Tower of Doom, the Eye of the Beholder series, Baldur's Gate 2, and one named Xantam in Baldur's Gate: Dark Alliance.

D&D Miniatures
 A beholder is featured in D&D Miniatures: Deathknell set #32 (2005).
 The Beholder Eye Tyrant was included as a random packed figure in D&D Miniatures: Dangerous Delves (#5/40) (2009).
 The Beholder Ultimate Tyrant was available as a visible piece Legendary Evils set (#6/40) (2009).

Media unrelated to Dungeons & Dragons
 The movie Big Trouble in Little China (1986) features a Beholder-like monster whose main job is spying the protagonists.
 Beholders appeared as a boss and recurring monster in the original Japanese version of Final Fantasy, but was renamed to "Evil Eye" and redesigned for the game's North American release to avoid copyright issues with TSR. Current installments of the Final Fantasy series have continued to use the monster with the design and name heavily altered.
Beholders appear as a recruitable unit in the 1999 video game Heroes of Might and Magic III. Once upgraded, these units are renamed to “Evil Eyes”.
 The Futurama episode "How Hermes Requisitioned His Groove Back" features a beholder who guards the Central Bureaucracy. He is a Grade 11 bureaucrat who begs the Planet Express crew not to tell its supervisor that he was sleeping on the job. He has another cameo in "Lethal Inspection", still working at the Central Bureaucracy.
A parody of the Beholder, named "The Beholster", appears as a boss in Enter the Gungeon, an indie game that includes numerous other references to Dungeons & Dragons.
 The Goblin Slayer series features a "Giant Eyeball" (episode 8 of the anime and volume 5 of the manga), which closely resembles a beholder with disintegration and magic dispelling abilities.
A beholder appears in the 2020 Pixar Animation Studios film Onward. The film's credits include a thanks to Wizards of the Coast for allowing them to use the beholder and the gelatinous cube.

References

Further reading
 Cagle, Eric. "Worshipers of the Forbidden." Dragon #296 (Paizo Publishing, 2002).
 Collins, Andy, Bruce R. Cordell, and Thomas M. Reid. Epic Level Handbook (Wizards of the Coast, 2002).
 Demokopoliss, Dougal. "The Ecology of the Spectator." Dragon #139 (TSR, 1988).
 Greenwood, Ed. "The Ecology of the Eye of the Deep." Dragon #93 (TSR, 1985).
 Mearls, Michael. "Eye Wares: Potent Powers of the Beholders." Dragon'' #313 (Paizo Publishing, 2003).

Dungeons & Dragons monsters